The Klias Peninsula is a peninsula in western of Sabah, Malaysia. It consists of coastal wetlands which become the largest mangrove and nipa swamp area in Sabah's west coast and serves as a major nurturing ground for fisheries resources in the Brunei Bay and Kimanis Bay.

Geology 
Miocene cobble conglomerates deposited in a tidally-influenced channel define a major sequence boundary exposed on the peninsula that can be correlated to paleo-shelf edge gorges imaged offshore on seismic data. Recent beach deposits on the area at 20 metre elevation indicate youthful uplift which offer a stellar example of drainage capture and facies variability in an active tropical foreland basin.

Climate and biodiversity 
The peninsula coastal area comprising the Kuala Penyu and Beaufort generally received mean annual rainfall ranging from 2,000 millimetres to 2,500 millimetres while towards the east annual rainfall reached between 2,500 millimetres and 3,000 millimetres. It consists of four forest reserve areas of Binsuluk, Klias, Menumbok and Padas Damit with much of its coastline is lined with mangroves. The area support large population of water birds together with 134 species from 59 tree families were recorded as well the population of proboscis monkeys.

References 

Peninsulas of Asia
Landforms of Sabah